Iranian New Zealanders, informally known as Persian Kiwis, are New Zealanders of Iranian national background or descent who are expatriates or permanent immigrants, and their descendants. The 2006 census found that 2,895 New Zealanders were born in Iran, although the figure of Iranian New Zealanders will be higher than this as many of them are born in another country.

Migration history

Most Iranian New Zealanders came to New Zealand after the Iranian Revolution of 1979. The community expanded in the early 1980s and 1990s during the Iran–Iraq War and its aftermath. However most Iranian emigrants since 2010 are professionals who revived their residence permit through emigration programs.

Demography
Around half of Iranians in New Zealand are Muslim, but those of Christian background are also present. Among Iranian migrants there are also Baháʼís who had been persecuted for their religion in Iran. From 1987 to 1989, 142 Baháʼís arrived in New Zealand as refugees

Notable people
Rasoul Amani, New Zealand wrestler who represented New Zealand in Graeco-Roman wrestling at the 2000 Summer Olympics
Nazanin "Naz" Khanjani, a contestant in Season 2 of The Bachelor NZ (aired on TV3), a reality dating show. She was born in Tehran (the capital of Iran), and moved to New Zealand at the age of 4.
Golriz Ghahraman, New Zealand politician, member of the Green Party of Aotearoa New Zealand, elected in 2017 member of parliament in the House of representatives in the 52nd New Zealand Parliament.

See also
 Iranian Australians
 Iranian diaspora

References

External links
New Zealand - Iran Friendship Association (NIFA)

Ethnic groups in New Zealand